Delmore is a surname. Notable people with the surname include:

Alycia Delmore, American actress
Andy Delmore, Canadian hockey player
Derrick Delmore, American figure skater
Vic Delmore, baseball umpire
The Delmore Brothers, country music duo